Megachile moureana is a species of bee in the family Megachilidae. It was described by Silveira et al. in 2002.

References

Moureana
Insects described in 2002